Ben Testerman (born February 2, 1962) is a former professional tennis player from the United States.  

During his career, he won one doubles title. He achieved a career-high singles ranking of World No. 22 in 1984 and a career-high doubles ranking of World No. 33 in 1985. His best achievement in singles competition was reaching the semifinals of the 1984 Australian Open, losing to Kevin Curren in five sets. He was inducted into the Tennessee Tennis Hall of Fame in 2008.

ATP career finals

Singles: 1 (1 runner-up)

Doubles: 4 (1 title, 3 runner-ups)

Junior Grand Slam finals

Singles: 1 (1 runner-up)

Performance timelines

Singles

Doubles

References

External links
 
 

1962 births
Living people
American male tennis players
Sportspeople from Knoxville, Tennessee
Tennessee Volunteers men's tennis players
Tennis people from Tennessee